Lithuania participated in the Eurovision Song Contest 2022 in Turin, Italy, with "" performed by Monika Liu. The Lithuanian broadcaster Lithuanian National Radio and Television (LRT) organised the national final  2022 (Let's try again! 2022) in order to select the Lithuanian entry for the 2022 contest. The national final took place over six weeks and involved 34 competing entries. The results of each show were determined by the combination of votes from a jury panel and a public vote. In the final, eight artists and songs remained and "" performed by Monika Liu was selected as the winner.

Lithuania was drawn to compete in the first semi-final of the Eurovision Song Contest which took place on 10 May 2022. Performing during the show in position 3, "" was announced among the top 10 entries of the first semi-final and therefore qualified to compete in the final on 14 May. It was later revealed that Lithuania placed seventh out of the 17 participating countries in the semi-final with 159 points. In the final, Lithuania performed in position 14 and placed 14th out of the 25 participating countries, scoring 128 points.

Background

Prior to the 2022 contest, Lithuania had participated in the Eurovision Song Contest 21 times since its first entry in 1994. The nation's best placing in the contest was sixth, which it achieved in 2006 with the song "We Are the Winners" performed by LT United. Following the introduction of semi-finals for the 2004, Lithuania, to this point, has managed to qualify to the final 10 times. In the 2021 contest, "Discoteque" performed by the Roop qualified to the final where the song scored 220 points and placed 8th.

For the 2022 contest, the Lithuanian national broadcaster, Lithuanian National Radio and Television (LRT), broadcast the event within Lithuania and organised the selection process for the nation's entry. Other than the internal selection of their debut entry in 1994, Lithuania has selected their entry consistently through a national final procedure. LRT confirmed their intentions to participate at the 2022 Eurovision Song Contest on 16 August 2021.

Before Eurovision

Pabandom iš naujo! 2022
 2022 (Let's try again! 2022) was the national final format developed by LRT in order to select Lithuania's entry for the Eurovision Song Contest 2022. The competition involved a six-week-long process that commenced on 8 January 2022 and concluded with a winning song and artist on 12 February 2022. The six shows took place at the LRT studios in Vilnius and were hosted by Ieva Stasiulevičiūtė, Giedrius Masalskis and Richardas Jonaitis. The shows were broadcast on LRT televizija, LRT Lituanica and LRT Radijas as well as online via the broadcaster's website lrt.lt.

Format 
The 2022 competition involved 34 entries and consisted of six shows. The first three shows were the heats consisting of 11 or 12 entries each. The top five entries advanced in the competition from each heat, while the remaining 18 entries participated in the fifth and sixth shows which were the competition's semi-finals where nine entries participated in each show and the top four proceeded to the final. In the final, the winner was selected from the remaining eight entries. The broadcaster allocated a budget of around €54,000 to be divided among the competing artists in order to support their preparations for the national final. A monetary prize of €5,000 was also awarded to the winning songwriters by the Lithuanian Copyright Protection Association (LATGA) in order to encourage further development of the song in an aim to achieve international success.

The results of each of the six shows were determined by the 50/50 combination of votes from a jury panel and public televoting. The ranking developed by both streams of voting was converted to points from 1-8, 10 and 12 and assigned based on the number of competing songs in the respective show. During the first five shows, the jury panel consisted of five members, while the jury panel in the final consisted of seven members. The public could vote through telephone and SMS voting. Ties in all shows were decided in favour of the entry that received the most points from the jury.

Competing entries
LRT opened a submission period on 1 October 2021 for artists and songwriters to submit their entries with the deadline on 25 November 2021. On 3 January 2020, LRT announced the 36 artists selected for the competition from more than 50 submissions received. Among the artists were previous Lithuanian Eurovision contestants Erica Jennings, who represented Lithuania in 2001 as part of Skamp, Vilija Matačiūnaitė, who represented the nation in 2014, Monika Linkytė, who represented the nation in 2015, and Ieva Zasimauskaitė, who represented the nation in 2018. On 11 January 2022, the final changes to the list of 36 competing acts were made with the withdrawal of the songs "Out of Mind" performed by Alekas for personal reasons and "See You Again" performed by Monika Linkytė due to illness of the singer.

Shows

Heats 
The three heats of the competition aired on 8, 15 and 22 January 2022 and featured the 34 competing entries. The members of the jury consisted of Ramūnas Zilnys (music reviewer; all heats), Ieva Narkutė (singer; all heats), Vytautas Bikus (composer; all heats), Gerūta Griniūtė (cultural presenter and event host; first and third heat), Vaidotas Valiukevičius (singer; first heat), Giedrė Kilčiauskienė (singer; second heat), Leon Somov (producer and composer; second heat) and Darius Užkuraitis (LRT Opus director; third heat). The top five advanced to the semi-finals from each heat, while the bottom entries were eliminated.

Semi-finals 

The two semi-finals of the competition aired on 29 January and 5 February 2022 and featured nine competing entries each. The members of the jury consisted of Ramūnas Zilnys (music reviewer; first and second semi-final), Ieva Narkutė (singer; first and second semi-final), Gerūta Griniūtė (cultural presenter and event host; first and second semi-final), Giedrė Kilčiauskienė (singer; first semi-final), Vaidotas Valiukevičius (singer; first semi-final), Vytautas Bikus (composer; second semi-final) and Stanislavas Stavickis-Stano (singer-songwriter; second semi-final). The top four entries advanced to the final from each semi-final, while the bottom entries were eliminated.

Final 
The final of the competition took place on 12 February 2022 and featured the remaining eight entries that qualified from the semi-finals. The final was the only show in the competition to be broadcast live; all other preceding shows were pre-recorded earlier in the week before their airdates. The members of the jury consisted of Ramūnas Zilnys (music reviewer), Gerūta Griniūtė (cultural presenter and event host), Vytautas Bikus (composer), Stanislavas Stavickis-Stano (singer-songwriter), Aistė Smilgevičiūtė (singer), Ieva Narkutė (singer) and Vaidotas Valiukevičius (singer). "" performed by Monika Liu was selected as the winner after gaining the most points from both the jury vote and the public vote.

Ratings

Promotion 
Monika Liu made several appearances across Europe to specifically promote "" as the Lithuanian Eurovision entry. On 26 March, Monika Liu performed during the Barcelona Eurovision Party, which was held at the Sala Apolo venue in Barcelona, Spain and hosted by Sharonne and Giuseppe Di Bella. On 3 April, Liu performed during the London Eurovision Party, which was held at the Hard Rock Hotel in London, United Kingdom and hosted by Paddy O'Connell and SuRie. On 7 April, Citi Zēni performed during the Israel Calling event held at the Menora Mivtachim Arena in Tel Aviv, Israel. On 9 April, Liu performed during the Eurovision in Concert event which was held at the AFAS Live venue in Amsterdam, Netherlands and hosted by Cornald Maas and Edsilia Rombley. On 16 April, Liu performed during the PrePartyES 2022 event which was held at the Sala La Riviera venue in Madrid, Spain and hosted by Ruth Lorenzo.

At Eurovision 

According to Eurovision rules, all nations with the exceptions of the host country and the "Big Five" (France, Germany, Italy, Spain and the United Kingdom) are required to qualify from one of two semi-finals in order to compete for the final; the top 10 countries from each semi-final progress to the final. The European Broadcasting Union (EBU) split up the competing countries into six different pots based on voting patterns from previous contests, with countries with favourable voting histories put into the same pot. On 25 January 2022, an allocation draw was held which placed each country into one of the two semi-finals, and determined which half of the show they would perform in. Lithuania was placed into the first semi-final, to be held on 10 May 2022, and was scheduled to perform in the first half of the show.

Once all the competing songs for the 2022 contest had been released, the running order for the semi-finals was decided by the shows' producers rather than through another draw, so that similar songs were not placed next to each other. Immediately after the close of the first semi-final, a press conference was held in which each of the artists drew the half of the final of which they would perform in.

The two semi-finals and final were broadcast in Lithuania on LRT televizija and LRT Radijas with commentary by Ramūnas Zilnys. The Lithuanian spokesperson, who announced the top 12-point score awarded by the Lithuanian jury during the final, was Vaidotas Valiukevičius who previously represented Lithuania in 2021 as part of the Roop.

Semi-final

Monika Liu took part in technical rehearsals on 30 April and 4 May, followed by dress rehearsals on 9 and 10 May. This included the jury show on 9 May where the professional juries of each country watched and voted on the competing entries.

The Lithuanian performance featured Monika Liu in a sparkly dress with diamonds and performing on stage alone with white lights on the kinetic sun and the LED floor displaying black and white geometric lines. The performance also featured a mirror camera effect during the chorus to show a duplicated Liu. The stage director for the Lithuanian performance was Povilas Varvuolis. It was revealed before the first semi-final that the Lithuanian delegation could not achieve what they wanted to on stage due to technical issues during the rehearsals.

At the end of the show, Lithuania was announced as having finished in the top 10 and subsequently qualifying for the final. It was later revealed that Lithuania placed seventh in the semi-final, receiving a total of 159 points: 103 points from the televoting and 56 points from the juries.

Final
Shortly after the first semi-final, a winners' press conference was held for the 10 qualifying countries. As part of this press conference, the qualifying artists took part in a draw to determine which half of the final they would subsequently participate in. This draw was done in the order the countries appeared in the semi-final running order. Lithuania was drawn to compete in the second half. Following this draw, the shows' producers decided upon the running order of the final, as they had done for the semi-finals.

Monika Liu once again took part in dress rehearsals on 13 and 14 May before the final, including the jury final where the professional juries cast their final votes before the live show. Monika Liu performed a repeat of her semi-final performance during the final on 14 May. Lithuania placed 14th in the final, scoring 128 points: 93 points from the televoting and 35 points from the juries.

Voting 

Below is a breakdown of points awarded to Lithuania during the first semi-final and final. Voting during the three shows involved each country awarding two sets of points from 1-8, 10 and 12: one from their professional jury and the other from televoting. The exact composition of the professional jury, and the results of each country's jury and televoting were released after the final; the individual results from each jury member were also released in an anonymised form. The Lithuanian jury consisted of Aistė Lasytė, Darius Užkuraitis, Ieva Narkutė, Jurga, and Vaidas Baumila. In the first semi-final, Lithuania finished in seventh place out of seventeen entries, marking Lithuania's second consecutive qualification to the final.

Points awarded to Lithuania

Points awarded by Lithuania

Detailed voting results
The following members comprised the Lithuanian jury:
 Aistė Lasytė – Singer
 Darius Užkuraitis – Musicologist, founder and director of LRT Opus
 Ieva Narkutė – Singer-songwriter
 Jurga Šeduikytė – Singer-songwriter
 Vaidas Baumila – singer, represented Lithuania in the Eurovision Song Contest 2015

References 

2022
Countries in the Eurovision Song Contest 2022
Eurovision